James Howell (c. 1594–1666) was an Anglo-Welsh historian and writer.

James Howell may also refer to:

 James Howell (chess player) (born 1967), English chess grandmaster and author
 James B. Howell (1816–1880), American lawyer, newspaper editor, and politician
 James Howell (politician) (1829–1897), mayor of Brooklyn, New York
 James F. Howell (born 1934), American politician in the state of Oklahoma
 James Howell, founder of Cardiff's Howells (department store) in 1856
 James Howell, early leader of Britain's National Association of Discharged Sailors and Soldiers
 J. P. Howell (James Phillip Howell, born 1983), American baseball pitcher
 Jamie Howell (born 1977), English footballer
 Jim Howell, Ambassador of New Zealand to Saudi Arabia, 2003–2007
 Jim Lee Howell (1914–1995), American football player and coach
 Jim Howell (politician) (born 1949), former member of the Michigan House of Representatives 
 Jim Howell (Kansas politician), American politician and former member of the Kansas House of Representatives